Walt D. Helmick (born March 25, 1944) is an American businessman and Democratic Party politician who served as the Commissioner of Agriculture of the state of West Virginia. He was elected to the position in 2012, defeating Republican nominee Kent Leonhardt. In 2016, Leonhardt defeated him in a rematch. Previously, he was a member of the West Virginia Senate, representing the 15th district from 1990 to 2012. Earlier he was a member of the West Virginia House of Delegates from 1988 through 1989, served on the Pocahontas County Commission and on the Pocahontas County School Board.

Electoral history

External links
Project Vote Smart - Senator Walt Helmick (WV) profile
Follow the Money - Walt Helmick
2008 2006 2004 2002 1998 Senate campaign contributions

1944 births
American Presbyterians
Businesspeople from West Virginia
County commissioners in West Virginia
Educators from West Virginia
Living people
Democratic Party members of the West Virginia House of Delegates
People from Webster Springs, West Virginia
School board members in West Virginia
West Virginia Commissioners of Agriculture
Democratic Party West Virginia state senators
West Virginia University Institute of Technology alumni
21st-century American politicians